Antonio Fernández Santillana (7 February 1876 – 6 December 1909) was an early pioneer in aviation.  He was a Spaniard residing in France and a tailor by profession.   Fernández became interested in aviation and constructed three aircraft during 1909, the third of which was exhibited at the Paris Aero Salon in October 1909.  He was killed at Nice when he lost control of his aircraft.

See also
List of fatalities from aviation accidents

References

1876 births
1909 deaths
Spanish aviators
Transport disasters in 1909
Aviators killed in aviation accidents or incidents in France
Aviation accidents and incidents in 1909
Spanish expatriates in France